Nicholas Copus (born 4 September 1966 in Hendon, London, England) is a British cinematographer, director, producer,  and writer of film and television. As a director his credits include EastEnders, Holby City, Painkiller Jane, The Dresden Files, The 4400, The Summit, Nikita, Alphas and The Day of the Triffids. As a producer and writer he worked on the series I Shouldn't Be Alive and If..., directing for those series as well.

References

External links

1966 births
British cinematographers
British documentary filmmakers
British expatriates in Canada
British television directors
British television producers
British television writers
Living people
People from Hendon
20th-century British screenwriters
20th-century English male writers
21st-century British screenwriters
21st-century English male writers
British male television writers
Writers from London
Film directors from London